Fenerbahçe Sports Club Football Academy is the collective organisation for the youth team of Fenerbahçe S.K. from Turkey. The academy has squads for ten age groups from ages 10 to 19.

Staff

Players

Current squad

See also
Fenerbahçe S.K.

References

External links
Fenerbahçe S.K. Academy Homepage 

Fenerbahçe S.K. (football)
Turkish youth football clubs
Football academies in Turkey
1907 establishments in the Ottoman Empire
NextGen series

tr:Fenerbahçe A2